The 1983 Tour de France was the 70th edition of Tour de France, one of cycling's Grand Tours. The Tour began in Fontenay-sous-Bois with a prologue individual time trial on 1 July and Stage 11 occurred on 12 July with a flat stage to Fleurance. The race finished on the Champs-Élysées in Paris on 24 July.

Prologue
1 July 1983 — Fontenay-sous-Bois,  (individual time trial)

Stage 1
2 July 1983 – Nogent-sur-Marne to Créteil,

Stage 2
3 July 1983 — Soissons to Fontaine-au-Pire,  (team time trial)

Stage 3
4 July 1983 — Valenciennes to Roubaix,

Stage 4
5 July 1983 — Roubaix to Le Havre,

Stage 5
6 July 1983 — Le Havre to Le Mans,

Stage 6
7 July 1983 — Châteaubriant to Nantes,  (individual time trial)

Stage 7
8 July 1983 — Nantes to Île d'Oléron,

Stage 8
9 July 1983 — La Rochelle to Bordeaux,

Stage 9
10 July 1983 — Bordeaux to Pau,

Stage 10
11 July 1983 — Pau to Bagnères-de-Luchon,

Stage 11
12 July 1983 — Bagnères-de-Luchon to Fleurance,

References

1983 Tour de France
Tour de France stages